Chambre noire was a French television show dedicated to photography. The show was broadcast between 1961-1969.

Premise

Chambre noire was presented by Michel Tournier and Albert Plécy. The show was directed by Claude Fayard. Each episode lasted between 28 to 40 minutes where notable photographers were interviewed about the artform of photography which was illustrated with photographs and films. 53 episodes were broadcast on channel ORTF which were released on monthly basis.

References

1961 French television series debuts
1969 French television series endings
1960s French television series
Photography in France